Protein wntless homolog, commonly known as Wntless, is encoded in humans by the WLS gene . Wntless is a receptor for Wnt proteins in Wnt-secreting cells.

Wntless was shown to be a cargo for the retromer complex. It has been found essential for hair follicle induction.

A homozygous missense mutation in the WLS gene was identified in Zaki syndrome.

References

Further reading

See also 
 

G protein-coupled receptors